Noel Paul Stookey (born December 30, 1937) is an American singer-songwriter who was famous for being in the 1960s folk trio Peter, Paul and Mary; however, he has been known by his first name, Noel, throughout his life. Nowadays, he continues to work as a singer and an activist, performing as a solo artist, and occasionally with former-bandmate Peter Yarrow.

Early life 
Stookey was born in Baltimore, Maryland, United States. His family moved to Birmingham, Michigan, when he was 12 years old, and he graduated from Birmingham High School (now Seaholm High School) in 1955.

Stookey is an alumnus of Michigan State University (MSU) in East Lansing, Michigan. While attending MSU, he joined Delta Upsilon fraternity. Though he credits a deep spiritual core for his work, Stookey "dispelled reports that he was born a Buddhist, saying his mother was a Roman Catholic and his dad was an ex-Mormon" and recalling the family's "eclectic attendance at church. I had no real spiritual sense until I was 30.'"

Personal life 
Stookey married Elizabeth "Betty" Bannard in 1963 and they have three daughters. After raising their family in Blue Hill, Maine, the couple lived for several years in Massachusetts while Betty served as the Northfield Mount Hermon School chaplain, and in 2005, they returned to Maine.  Stookey continued recording his solo albums in his private studio—a converted four-story henhouse—on his Maine property. This studio, known as "The Henhouse", was also the origin point of the first broadcasts of WERU upon that station's inception in 1988.

Music career

Peter, Paul and Mary 
Performing as Paul in the Peter, Paul and Mary trio, he participated in one of the best-known ensembles of the 1960s phase of the American folk music revival, and included some of his solo songs and extended monologues in their performances and recordings.

One of Stookey's songs, "Norman Normal", which appeared on The Peter, Paul and Mary Album (1966), inspired a Warner Bros. animated cartoon also titled Norman Normal (1968). Stookey co-wrote the story for the cartoon and voiced several of the characters.

In addition to his recordings with the trio, he released a number of solo works, several albums with the ensemble Bodyworks, and some anthologies. He was an important artist in the young Jesus music movement, which would later bloom into the Christian music industry, although his generally liberal political views distinguish him from many such artists.

In 1986, Stookey teamed up with Jim Newton, Paul G. Hill, and Denny Bouchard at Celebration Shop in Texas. The company, now known as Kidlinks, uses original musical compositions as music therapy to address the special needs of children. The company has produced three award-winning children's CDs used in hospitals, medical camps and homes across the country.

Stookey was awarded the Kate Wolf Memorial Award by the World Folk Music Association in 2000.

Solo career 
During 1971 and 1972 Warner released a debut solo album by each member of the group. Each of these had similarly styled cover art. Stookey's album "Paul, and" was the highest of the three on the music charts, reaching number 42 on the Billboard 200 chart in the United States in September 1971. 

Stookey's best-known composition "The Wedding Song (There Is Love)" was included on his debut solo album. The song was also released as a single which reached number 24 in the Billboard Hot 100. He wrote the song as a wedding gift for Peter Yarrow, and refused to perform it for the public until Yarrow requested it at a concert where his wife was present. Stookey assigned the copyright of this song to the Public Domain Foundation (PDF), a nonprofit 501(c)3.

After Peter, Paul and Mary 
Paul performed as a member of Peter, Paul and Mary until the death of Mary in September 2009. His work after Peter, Paul and Mary has emphasized his faith, family life and social concerns. He remains active in the music industry, performing as a solo act, and occasionally with Peter Yarrow.

In 2000 Noel and his daughter, Elizabeth Stookey Sunde, founded the nonprofit Music to Life, which builds on the strong historical legacy of social movements' intentional use of music to educate, recruit, and mobilize. M2L revitalizes music to meet the challenges of the modern world and revolutionize the role activist artists can play in accelerating social change. Music to Life understands the complexity of contemporary causes and the diversity of musical genres. They blend this knowledge with multimedia technologies and programming techniques to develop unique musical experiences that amplify an organization's message, spark engagement with a cause, and empower activist artists to stand on the front lines of social change.

In January 2011, centered on Martin Luther King Jr. Day, Stookey participated in several events at Dartmouth College that celebrated King's life, including "Music for Social Change with Noel Paul Stookey and Company."

Production 
He also has production credits on a wide range of albums including jazz saxaphonist Paul Winter, comedian Tim Sample and several singer-songwriters, among them Dave Mallett, Michael Kelly Blanchard and Gordon Bok. He was the founder of the Neworld Multimedia record label.

Discography

Albums

Singles

References

External links 

 
 Peter, Paul and Mary official website

1937 births
Living people
American folk guitarists
American folk singers
American male singer-songwriters
Michigan State University alumni
People from Blue Hill, Maine
People from Greenwich Village
People from Birmingham, Michigan
American performers of Christian music
Warner Records artists
American baritones
American acoustic guitarists
American male guitarists
Singer-songwriters from Michigan
Guitarists from Michigan
American banjoists
20th-century American guitarists
20th-century American male musicians
Singer-songwriters from New York (state)